Meintjeskop is a hill in Pretoria on which the Union Buildings (die Uniegebou(e) in Afrikaans) were constructed.

Marthinus Wessel Pretorius, later to become first president of the Transvaal Republic, was the original owner of the farm 'Elandsfontein' on which Meintjieskop stands. In 1856 Andries Francois du Toit (1813–1883), in exchange for a Basuto pony, acquired part of the farm, which he named Arcadia. He was also Pretoria’s first magistrate and was responsible for planning the layout of the city.  During this period he sold his land for £1200 to Stephanus Jacobus Meintjes (1819–1887), and by 1870 it bore the name Mentjieskop.

Meintjeskop is part of the Witwatersberg Ridge, which runs east–west through Pretoria. Geologically it forms part of the Pretoria Group of the Transvaal sequence.

References

Hills of South Africa